Fencing at the 2015 African Games in Brazzaville was held between September 2–6, 2015.

Medal summary

Medal table

Results

References

2015 African Games
All-Africa Games
2015